Kim Jae-woo (Hangul: 김재우; born 6 February 1998) is a South Korean footballer currently playing for Daejeon Hana Citizen in K League 2.

Honours

International
South Korea U23
AFC U-23 Championship: 2020

External links

 

1998 births
Living people
South Korean footballers
South Korean expatriate footballers
South Korean expatriate sportspeople in Austria
Expatriate footballers in Austria
SV Horn players
Bucheon FC 1995 players
Daegu FC players
K League 2 players
2. Liga (Austria) players
Association football defenders
Footballers at the 2020 Summer Olympics
Olympic footballers of South Korea